Volkan Fındıklı (born 13 October 1990) is a Turkish professional footballer who plays as a defender for Altınordu F.K. in the TFF First League.

Career
Fındıklı started his career with Marmaris Belediye GSK, and since then has progressed in various levels of the Turkish football pyramid. On 28 May 2014, he signed a three-year contract with Konyaspor. There, he made his European debut in the 2016–17 UEFA Europa League on 29 September 2016, in a 2–0 away loss to Gent.

Honours
Konyaspor
Turkish Cup: 2016–17
Turkish Super Cup: 2017

References

External links
 
 

1990 births
Living people
Konyaspor footballers
Turkish footballers
Süper Lig players
Sportspeople from Muğla
Association football defenders
Dardanelspor footballers
1922 Konyaspor footballers